Visa requirements for citizens of the Republic of Lebanon are administrative entry restrictions by the authorities of other sovereign countries and territories placed on citizens of the Republic of Lebanon.

As of 2022 citizens of the Republic of Lebanon had visa-free or visa on arrival access to 41 and territories, ranking the Lebanese passport 103rd in terms of travel freedom according to the Henley Passport Index.

Citizens of the Republic of Lebanon do not need a passport when travelling to Jordan and Syria. For these countries, they may use just their domestic national identification cards called in Arabic: بطاقة الهوية (bițāqat al-hawiya) and in French: carte nationale d'identité.

Besides visa requirements, most countries specify other requirements which preclude the entry of citizens of the Republic of Lebanon and other citizens into their territory such as the prospective entrant not having a criminal history or health issues and presenting evidence of sufficient funds or a ticket for exit and many other factors.

Visa requirements map

Visa requirements
General visa requirements of fully internationally recognized sovereign countries and territories towards citizens of the Republic of Lebanon:

Dependent, Disputed, or Restricted Territories 
Visa requirements for citizens of the Republic of Lebanon for visits to various territories, disputed areas, partially recognized countries not mentioned in the list above, and restricted zonesand restricted zones:

Non-ordinary passports
Holders of Diplomatic, Service, and Official passports issued by the Republic of Lebanon have visa-free or visa on arrival (VoA) access to the following additional countries and territories (both mutual and unilateral):

Non-visa restrictions

Consular protection abroad

Diplomatic Missions of the Republic of Lebanon are to advance the interests of the Republic of Lebanon, and to serve and protect the citizens of the Republic of Lebanon. There are currently 104 diplomatic missions of the Republic of Lebanon abroad.

See also List of diplomatic missions of Lebanon.

See also

 Visa policy of Lebanon
 Lebanese passport
 Constitution of Lebanon
 Driving license in Lebanon
 Foreign relations of Lebanon
 History of Lebanon
 Lebanese diaspora
 Lebanese identity card
 Lebanese nationality law
 Politics of Lebanon
 Vehicle registration plates of Lebanon

References and notes

References

Notes

Lebanon
Foreign relations of Lebanon